Lynne Arriale is an American jazz pianist, composer, bandleader and educator.  She is Professor of Jazz Studies and Director of Small Ensembles at the University of North Florida.

Awards and honors
"The Lights Are Always On" (2022) #3 on JazzWeek Radio charts
"The Lights Are Always On" (2022) #19 on JazzWeek Radio charts, CDs receiving the most airplay in 2020
"Chimes of Freedom" (2020) #8 on JazzWeek Radio charts
"Chimes of Freedom"(2020) #34 on JazzWeek Radio charts,CDs receiving the most airplay in 2020 
"Give Us These Days" (2018) #15 on JazzWeek Radio charts
"Solo" (2012) #28 JazzWeek Radio charts
"Convergence" (2011) #4 on JazzWeek Radio charts
"Convergence" (2011) Top 50 CDs of 2011, JazzTimes
"Nuance" (2008) #4 on JazzWeek Radio charts
"Lynne Arriale Trio Live" (2005) #17 on JazzWeek Radio charts
"Come Together" (2003) #3 on JazzWeek Radio charts
"Arise"(2002) #1 on JazzWeek Radio charts
 First place, The Great American Jazz Piano Competition (1993)

Discography
An asterisk (*) indicates that the year is that of release.

As leader

As guest
 1998 Pat Harbison Quartet, After All
 1999 Wolfgand Lackerschmid Quartet (TCB)
 2002 Rachel Caswell, Some Other Time
 2005 Sara Caswell, But Beautiful (Arbors)
 2009* Rondi Charleston Who Knows Where the Time Goes (Motéma)

References

External links
Official Site
Lynne Arriale at Motéma Music
[ Allmusic]
Biography, reviews, interview

1957 births
Living people
Wisconsin Conservatory of Music alumni
American jazz pianists
Musicians from Milwaukee
American women jazz musicians
University of North Florida faculty
American jazz educators
20th-century American women pianists
20th-century American pianists
21st-century American women pianists
21st-century American pianists
Women music educators
Motéma Music artists
American women academics